Ängelholms FF is a football club based in Ängelholm, Sweden. The club is affiliated to Skånes Fotbollförbund and play their home games at Ängelholms IP. The club was formed in 1976 as a merger between Ängelholms IF and Skörpinge GIF. The club plays in Division 1, the third highest tier of Swedish football.

History
Ängelholms IF were founded in 1905 and Skörpinge GIF were founded in 1950. Ängelholms IF had their most successful period in the 1930s when they played in Swedish Division 2 against clubs such as Malmö FF, Halmstads BK and Helsingborgs IF. Ängelholms IF were the most successful club in Ängelholm until Skörpinge GIF were founded and later seriously started to compete for the best talents of the town.

Discussions of a possible merger initiated in 1975 after the two clubs realised the potential in a merger. Both clubs realised that the best opportunity for Ängelholm to have a professional club would be to merge the two clubs. They merged in 1976 and founded Ängelholms FF. However the success that the two clubs had in vision took until the 1990s to aspire. Between 1997 and 2001, Ängelholms FF were promoted from Division 4 to the second highest tier, Superettan. The club was relegated back to Division 2 and played there until they were promoted to the newly created tier three, Division 1. The club was once again promoted in their second season of the league and found themselves in Superettan for the second time in the club's history. In 2008 the club reached their highest position in the Swedish league system yet, 5th place in Superettan.

On 22 December 2016 the club applied for bankruptcy. However, on 17 January 2017, it was announced that the club had been saved from bankruptcy.

Players

First-team squad

Retired numbers
12 – Daniel Johansson, defender (1996–2009)

Achievements

League
 Division 2 Västra Götaland:

Footnotes

References

External links

 Ängelholms FF – official site

 
Football clubs in Skåne County
Sport in Ängelholm
Association football clubs established in 1976
1976 establishments in Sweden